Igor Ivanovich (Garik) Sukachov (1 December 1959) 
is a Russian musician, singer-songwriter, poet, actor, film director and TV presenter.

Career 
Igor Ivanovich Sukachov was born in the Moscow suburb of Myakinino (now Tushino). His father fought in World War II, having fought throughout the war from Moscow to Berlin. His mother was a Nazi concentration camp survivor.

Having graduated the railway technical college, Sukachyov became a transport engineer and even took part in designing the Tushino railway station. However, an abrupt change of mind brought him to study theater at the Lipetsk Culture and Education College, which he graduated in 1977 with a theater director diploma. The same year he formed the band Zakat Solntsa Vruchnuyu ("Sunset manually"), which, after the release of one album on tape, broke up in 1983. Also in 1983, with Evgeny Khavtan, Sukachyov created another band, Postscriptum, which released one album (Don't Give Up!, 1982) and after his departure in 1984 joined forces with singer Zhanna Aguzarova to become the group Bravo.

In 1986 he formed Brigada S, the self-described 'proletarian jazz orchestra', with guitarist Sergey Galanin, whom he knew from his Lipetsk days. They released six studio albums, featured in Savva Kulish's film The Tragedy in Rock, toured the United States and, after two line-up changes involving Galanin's quitting and returning, disbanded in 1993. In 1989 Sukachyov co-organized the Rock Against Terror event alongside Alexander F. Sklyar, which featured a speech in the defense of the rights of sexual minorities, one of the first in the Soviet Union.

In 1994 Sukachyov formed Neprikasayemye, a more urban folk-oriented outfit, which released nine studio albums in 1994–2010. The band held massive tours across Russia and did several concerts with Emir Kusturica. Sukachov's solo career started in 1991; he released ten studio solo albums including My Vysotsky (2014). The melody of Sukachov's song "Napoi menia vodoi" ("Quench my thirst") was used in Robert Miles's 1995 song Children.

In 1988 Sukachov started his career in cinema, appearing in twenty films and directing three more himself, mostly in the 1990s. In 1999 Sukachyov published his first book, The King of the Boulevard (Korol prospekta), followed by Where the Rain Ends (Gde konchayetsa dozhd, 2001).

Views 
Sukachov publicly stated in December 2014 that he supports Russian separatists in the war in Donbass. In January 2015, he released an internet music video recorded to support the separatists. Ivan Okhlobystin, a Russian actor, and Alexander F. Sklyar, a Russian musician, also participated in the video. In 2022, he supported the Russian invasion of Ukraine.

Discography

Brigada S 

 1988 — Добро пожаловать в запретную зону (Dobro pojalovat' v zapretnuyu zonu) - Welcome to the no-go zone
 1989 - Ностальгическое танго (Nostal'gicheskoe tango) - Nostalgic tango
 1991 — Аллергии — нет! (Allergii - net!) - Allergies - no!
 1992 — Всё это рок-н-ролл (Vsyo eto rok-n-roll) - It's only rock and roll
 1993 — Реки (Reki) - Rivers
 1994 — Я обожаю jazz. Зэ бэст 1986-1989 (Ya odojayu jazz. Ze best 1986-1989) - I adore jazz. The best 1986-1989

Neprikasaemie 

 1994 — Брёл, брёл, брёл (Bryol, bryol, bryol) - Walked, walked, walked
 1995 — Между водой и огнём (Mejdu vodoy i ognyom) - Between water and fire
 1999 — Города, где после дождя дымится асфальт (Goroda, gde posle dojdya dymitsa asfalt) - The city where past rain smoking asphalt
 1999 — Барышня и дракон (Barishnia i drakon) - Lady and the Dragon
 2002 — Ночной полёт (Nochnoi polyot) - Night flight
 2005 — Третья чаша (Tretya chasha) - The third cup
 2006 — Оборотень с гитарой (Oboroten' s gitaroi) - The Werewolf with a guitar
 2010 — 5:0 в мою пользу (Pyat'-nol' v moyu pol'zu) - I'm 5:0

Solo Projects 

 1991 — Акция Нонсенс (Aktsiya Nonsens) - Action Nonsense
 1995 — Боцман и бродяга. Я милого узнаю по походке (Botsman i brodyaga. Ya milogo uznayu po pohodke) - Boatswain and a tramp. I recognize the sweet in his walk (with Alexandr F. Sklyar)
 1996 — Песни с окраины (Pesni s okrainy) - Songs from the outskirts
 1998 — Кризис среднего возраста (Krizis srednego vozrasta) - Midlife crisis
 1999 — Барышня и дракон (Barishnia i drakon) - Lady and the Dragon
 2001 — Фронтовой альбом (Frontovoy al'bom) - Frontline album
 2003 — Poetica (Poetica) - Poetica
 2003 — 44 (Sorok chetyre) - 44
 2005 — Перезвоны (Perezvony) - Chimes

TV 
"Besedka" (The Arbor), on Channel One (Russia), 1992.

Cinema

As director and screenwriter 

 1997 - Кризис среднего возраста (Krizis srednego vozrasta) - Midlife crisis
 2001 - Праздник (Prazdnik) - The Holiday
 2010 - Дом Солнца (Dom Sontsa) - The House of the Sun

As actor 

Sukachov has acted in over films. The following is a selection of the most famous:
 1988 - The tragedy in the style of rock (Трагедия в стиле рок - Tragediya v stile rok)
 1991 - Lost in Siberia (Потерянный в Сибири - Poteryannyy v Sibiri)
 2004 - Arie (Арье - Arie)
 2005 - Dead Man's Bluff (Жмурки - Zhmurki)
 2010 - The House of the Sun (Дом Cолнца - Dom Solntsa)
 2017 Bird (Птица - Ptitsa)

Sukachov also writes scores for animated movies and foreign films.

References

External links
 
 Игорь (Гарик) Сукачёв Король проспекта. — ЛЕАН, 1999. —  
 Neprikasaemie (profil) on Thank_you 
 "  (traditional), revived on stage by Garik Sukachyov (in duet with Alexander F. Sklyar, to the left)
Garik Sukachov at the Forbes

1959 births
Russian chanson
Male actors from Moscow
Russian male poets
Russian rock guitarists
Russian male guitarists
Russian rock singers
Living people
Russian male actors
Russian television personalities
Russian directors
20th-century Russian singers
21st-century Russian singers
Singers from Moscow
20th-century Russian male singers
21st-century Russian male singers